Psilochira is a genus of tussock moths in the family Erebidae. The genus was erected by Lambertus Johannes Toxopeus in 1948.

Species
The following species are included in the genus:
 Psilochira amydra (Collenette 1932)
 Psilochira durioides (Strand 1915)
 Psilochira lineata (Walker 1855)
 Psilochira lineata nycthemera Toxopeus 1948
 Psilochira lineata sinuata Toxopeus 1948
 Psilochira venusta (Collenette 1933)

References

Lymantriini
Noctuoidea genera
Taxa named by Lambertus Johannes Toxopeus